Michael Peter Anthony Sellers (2 April 1954 – 24 July 2006) was a British builder, car restorer, author and the son of actor Peter Sellers. He also had small parts in a couple of his father's films. He was often interviewed by the media about his relationship with his father. Despite a tenuous and troubled relationship with his father he frequently defended him and his legacy.

Life
Michael Sellers was Peter Sellers' son from his first marriage to actress Anne Howe. His close friend at prep school (Hall School, Hampstead) was actor Donald Sinden's son Marc Sinden. When Michael was seven his parents divorced and in an interview Marc Sinden said that Peter Sellers always behaved badly towards Michael. He also recalled seeing some of the letters Michael received from his father and concluded that he was a "really, really nasty man".

During the school year he stayed with his mother and stepfather, while he spent the school holidays with Peter Sellers. Sellers was insecure about his relationship with his son and became vindictive; despite this, Michael remained close to his father up until his death. They had spent some quality time together just before Peter's death.

In his will Peter Sellers left Michael about £800 from his multi-million pound estate. Michael Sellers also claimed that the £800 he received was a calculated act to prevent him from contesting the will, since under English law only complete disinheritance provided the legal grounds for a challenge of the will.

Career
Michael Sellers' film career started early when at age seven he played the role of Gaston in the film Mr. Topaze, directed by his father. As an adult he became a builder and property dealer.

He went on to star in I Told You I Was Ill: The Life and Legacy of Spike Milligan (2005), a film he did in collaboration with the children of Spike Milligan. He also wrote three biographical books about his father.

Despite his turbulent relationship with his father, he often defended his father's legacy. Upon the release of the 2004 film The Life and Death of Peter Sellers, based on the book of the same name by Roger Lewis, Sellers railed against Lewis and Stephen Hopkins, the film's director. Sellers was incensed at the portrayal of his father as clinically insane. Sellers, at the time, called Roger Lewis' book "400 pages of rubbish". Hopkins responded to Sellers’ comments when he appeared at the film festival to promote the film, stating that the film was not disrespectful to Peter Sellers.

In 2000 he produced his last book, Sellers On Sellers, where he wrote:

In the 2020 BBC Two documentary ‘’A State of Comic Ecstacy’’, Michael’s son Will said that the strained relationship between Peter and Michael, and particularly the situation with the will (greatly favouring Fredericks, which Will claimed was “the price he [Peter] paid” to get her back after a separation), “ate [Michael] up. It played upon him throughout his life... I don’t think he ever really got over how things were left with him and Peter.”

Death
Michael Sellers died of a heart attack, like his father. His death occurred on the 26th anniversary of his father's death.

Films
 Mr. Topaze (1961) (aka I Like Money (USA)) as Gaston
 I Told You I Was Ill: The Life and Legacy of Spike Milligan (2005) (aka The Life and Legacy of Spike Milligan), as Himself
 This Morning (one episode, 29 September 2004), as Himself
 Somebody's Daughter, Somebody's Son (Episode #1.2 (2004) TV) as Himself
 Kelly (one episode, 20 October 2000) as Himself

Books published
 P.S. I Love You (1981)
 A Hard Act to Follow (with Gary Morecambe; 1996)
  Sellers on Sellers (with Gary Morecambe; 2000)

References

External links
 

1954 births
2006 deaths
Car restorers
English male film actors
English people of Portuguese-Jewish descent
English writers
People educated at The Hall School, Hampstead
People educated at Ibstock Place School
Michael